This event was held on Sunday 27 January 2008 as a part of the 2008 UCI Cyclo-cross World Championships in Treviso, Italy.

Ranking

 

Two riders, Katie Compton and Birgit Hollmann, abandoned the race.

Notes

External links
 Union Cycliste Internationale

Women's elite race
UCI Cyclo-cross World Championships – Women's elite race
2008 in cyclo-cross